The I Look Like an Engineer movement was created in August 2015 by software developer Isis Anchalee (formerly Isis Wenger) as a response to the backlash the OneLogin recruitment ad in which she was featured received. The movement aspired to break the stereotypes and promote diversity around underrepresented groups, particularly women, POC, and LGBTQ+ individuals in engineering fields. Its primary tactic is the use of the hashtag #ILookLikeAnEngineer on social media sites such as Twitter, Facebook, and Instagram, along with pictures of engineers or engineering students.

The I Look Like an Engineer movement has sparked other similar movements that also seek to break stereotypes in their industry, such as I Look Like a Surgeon, I Look like a Professor and I Look Like a Civil Engineer.

OneLogin campaign 
In the summer of 2015 OneLogin, a software company, created a recruitment campaign aimed at attracting engineers to their home office in San Francisco, California. Four employees were invited to participate, including Anchalee. The ads were placed in the BART public transit stations and showed several OneLogin engineers sharing their experience working for the company. The ad featuring Anchalee went viral on several social media sites. A week after the launch of the campaign went viral, OneLogin posted an article on their blog that talked about the importance of diversity, inclusion, and innovation.

Movement beginnings 
The OneLogin recruitment ad featuring Isis Anchalee went viral as her particular ad received comments stating the belief that she was a model and not an actual engineer. Anchalee took to social media where she posted a picture of herself holding a piece of paper describing her job and a caption with the hashtag, #ILookLikeanEngineer. In her post she stated her belief that it is important to raise awareness in tech diversity and break the stereotypes of what an engineer should look like.

Her post started the hashtag trend and the hashtag was used 86,000 times by August 7, 2015. The hashtag has been used in approximately 50 countries. The hashtag is mainly used by women and LGBTQ engineers. Subsequently, Anchalee put up a now-defunct webpage to establish a safe platform for individuals to share their experiences related to diversity issues within tech fields.

Support 
In an effort to make a lasting impact, Michelle Glauser (the spouse of Anchalee's co-worker) began a fundraising campaign using Indiegogo to create billboards with pictures that people had shared on social media using the hashtag #ILookLikeanEngineer. The proceeds were used to put up more billboards to further the I Look Like an Engineer campaign and excess proceeds were used to fund organizations that teach programming to minorities. The fundraiser’s goal was to raise $3,500. The campaigned ended on September 5, 2015 with $47,285 raised.

Concurrently, an #ILookLikeanEngineer community gathering organized by Glauser through Eventbrite as part of efforts to continue further the movement was hosted on August 13, 2015, in San Francisco. During the gathering, photographers collected portraits of willing participants for the billboards and as an effort to document the event. The event was sponsored by Segment, Rackspace, OneLogin, and HackBright Academy. The event included networking, discussions and a Q&A panel which included Anchalee, Alicia Morga, Wayne Sutton, Erica Baker, Leslie Miley, and Dom DeGuzman.

Significance 
The struggles that women face in the field of engineering have a long-documented history. In the postwar era, female engineering students found themselves in a mixture of conflicting and positive situations that shaped not only their professional experiences but the field itself. Women faced backlash from not just male students and professors who objectified and viewed female engineers as potential girlfriends instead of fellow students, but also from women faculty or older female students who demanded that younger women endured the same struggles they did.

The campus and corporate climate did not change until the mid-1970s when companies began to face civil rights pressure to be more inclusive of female engineers. However, even with these radical changes women continued to experience subtle and overt forms of discrimination in the workplace. During the 1970s, organizations like the Society of Women Engineers (founded in 1952) among others provided women with support and guidance both on college campuses and in the corporate world.

Recognizing the challenges that women faced and continue to face in male-dominated fields raises awareness about the importance of diversity and intersectionality in the field of engineering and other tech fields. Social movements are taking place in online spaces more frequently as the community of users tends to be wider and more diverse. It is here where users can use their own personal experiences and public outcry to start global dialogues that can enact change.

See also 
Girls Who Code
Native Girls Code
Black Girls Code
Hashtag activism
Slacktivism
Online Social Movements
Fourth-wave feminism
Women in engineering
Women in STEM fields

References 

Feminist organizations in the United States
Science education
Stereotypes of women
Social media campaigns
2015 establishments in the United States